Wagah, also spelled Wagha, is a village and union council (UC 181) located in the Wahga Zone near Lahore City District, Pakistan. The town is famous for the Wagah border ceremony and also serves as a goods transit terminal and a railway station between Pakistan and India. It is also  from the bordering village of Attari, India. The Wagah ceremony takes place every evening.

Wagah-Attari border ceremony

Border crossing
The border crossing draws its name from Wahga village, near which the Radcliffe Line, the boundary demarcation line dividing India and Pakistan upon the Partition of British India, was drawn. At the time of the independence in 1947, migrants from India entered Pakistan through this border crossing and vice versa.

Border crossing ceremony
The Wagah-Attari border ceremony happens at the border gate, two hours before sunset each day. The flag ceremony is conducted by the Pakistan Rangers and Indian Border Security Force (BSF), similar to the retreat ceremonies at Ganda Singh Wala/Hussainiwala border crossing and Mahavir/Sadqi International Parade Ground border crossing. A marching ceremony, known as the "Silly Walk ceremony", is conducted each evening along with the flag ceremony. The ceremony started in 1986 as an agreement of peace, although there was not a conflict at that time. Other Middle East nations have adopted similar ceremonies in recent years.

Wagah flag 
Following India's erection of a 360 ft (110m) flagpole on their side of the border in Attari, in August 2017, a 400 ft (122m) Pakistani flag was installed on the Wagah side. The pole in pattadei is the largest in India.

Gallery

See also
 Wagha railway station
 Lahore–Wagah Branch Line
 2014 Wagah border suicide attack
 Khyber Pass

References

External links 

 Michael Palin at the India-Pakistan border ceremony on the Pakistani side (from Himalaya with Michael Palin). BBCWorldwide video on YouTube.
 Sanjeev Bhaskar at the India-Pakistan border ceremony on the Indian side. BBCWorldwide video on YouTube.
 Pictures of independence's 60th anniversary celebration at Wagah Border

Wagha Town
India–Pakistan border crossings
Villages in Punjab, Pakistan
Checkpoints